Mediabistro is a website that offers career and job search resources for media professionals.  It publishes various blogs which analyze the mass media industry, including the film and the publishing industries. It also provides job listings, courses, and seminars for journalists. The site was founded in 1999 by Laurel Touby as "a gathering place for professionals in journalism, publishing and other media-related industries in New York City". Mediabistro has since grown into an international resource for media professionals.

On July 17, 2007, the site was acquired by WebMediaBrands, later known as Mediabistro, for $20 million in cash plus a two-year earn-out that could result in an additional $3 million.

In August 2014, Mediabistro's publishing assets were acquired by Prometheus Global Media, a subsidiary of Guggenheim Partners, for $8 million. The acquisition did not include Mediabistro's expo business, which were retained under the name Mecklermedia.

The company was later acquired by Parrut, Inc. In 2021, Mediabistro was purchased by Recruiter.com Group, Inc., a recruiting solutions platform, for an undisclosed sum.

References

External links
 
 "How I Did It", Laurel Touby, Inc. Magazine profile

Online mass media companies of the United States